Roberto Lovati (20 July 1927 – 30 March 2011) was an Italian association football manager and footballer who played as a goalkeeper. He represented the Italy national football team twice, the first being on 25 April 1957, the occasion of a friendly match against Northern Ireland in a 1–0 home win. He was also part of Italy's squad for the 1952 Summer Olympics, but he did not play in any matches.

Honours

Player
Lazio
Coppa Italia: 1958

References

1927 births
2011 deaths
Italian footballers
Italy international footballers
Association football goalkeepers
Serie A players
Serie B players
Pisa S.C. players
A.C. Monza players
Torino F.C. players
S.S. Lazio players
S.S. Lazio managers
Italian football managers